Akramabad-e Chahgavari (also Romanized as Akramābād-e Chahgavārī) is a village in Gonbaki Rural District, Gonbaki District, Rigan County, Kerman Province, Iran. At the 2006 census, its population was 164, in 33 families.

References 

Populated places in Rigan County